Viktor Kalivoda (11 September 1977 in Slaný – 26 September 2010 in Valdice Prison), also known as the "Forest Killer", was a Czech spree killer who shot three people.

Youth
Kalivoda was born in Slaný, where he studied at the local grammar school, excelling in mathematics and physics. His classmates described him as a silent, introverted loner.

In 1996, he passed his matura. He then studied at the Faculty of Informatics of the Masaryk University in Brno and the Faculty of Education of the University of South Bohemia in České Budějovice, before working as a policeman for Prague 6. He attempted suicide several times, once even longing to jump off from the Nusle Bridge.

In 2004, he won 320 000 Czech koruna on Chcete být milionářem?.

Murders
Two days after his 28th birthday, he decided to kill people. On 13 October 2005, an older couple was shot dead in the forest near Nedvědice, hitting them in the chest and head. Three days later, on 16 October, he gunned down a Malíkovice man who was on a walk with his dog.

On 20 October, he was arrested on the basis of eyewitness testimonies in Slaný in front of the panel house Vikova 272, where he lived. A Glock 34 was found inside.

Trial and death
The trial began in 2006. Kalivoda did not admit his motive during the hearing, but said that he wanted to shoot up the Prague Metro, in particular the Line C, before the triple murder. Several times he hid a pistol with a newspaper in the metro, but did not find courage to do it.

He did not show regret for his actions. On 27 June 2006, he was sentenced to life imprisonment; the possibility of resocialization was, according to psychologists, zero.  

In prison letters, he admitted to being inspired by Olga Hepnarová.

On 26 September 2010, Kalivoda committed suicide in Valdice Prison by cutting his veins.

References

External links
He never laughed, they said about forest shooter known by iDNES.cz (in Czech)

1977 births
2010 suicides
Czech spree killers
People from Slaný
Murderers who committed suicide in prison custody
Who Wants to Be a Millionaire?
Suicides by sharp instrument in the Czech Republic